The 1996–97 Eliteserien season was the 40th season of ice hockey in Denmark. Ten teams participated in the league, and Herning IK won the championship.

First round

Final round

Relegation round

Playoffs

External links 
 Season on hockeyarchives.info

Dan
Eliteserien (Denmark) seasons
1996 in Danish sport
1997 in Danish sport